Toybox is an Australian children's television series first screened on the Seven Network on October 14, 2010, and since re-aired on 7TWO numerous times and last aired re-runs in April 2020. The series is created by Beyond, produced and directed by Ian Munro, with 290 half-hour episodes for pre-school children.

Cast
Brittany Byrnes as Tina the Dancing Doll (Series 1–3)
Aleisha Rose as Tina the Dancing Doll (Series 4)
Riley Nottingham as Tom the Cowboy Builder
Leighton Young as Super Ned the Robot (series 1)
Nick Skubij as Super Ned the Robot (series 2)
Kyal Scott as Super Ned the Robot (series 3, 4)
Ranee Clayton as Patches the Rag Doll
Roslyn Oades as Remy
Sean Masterson as Rici

References

External links 
Toybox on 7plus

Australian children's television series
Sentient toys in fiction
Fiction about toys
Australian television shows featuring puppetry
7two original programming
2010 Australian television series debuts
2014 Australian television series endings
Musical television series
Television series by Beyond Television Productions
Australian preschool education television series